Several ships of the Spanish Navy have borne the name Rayo:

 , a 6-gun fireship
 , an 80-gun ship of the line, later rebuilt as a 100-gun three-decker, fought and sunk at the Battle of Trafalgar
 , a gunboat, saw service in Cuba
 , a torpedo boat, entered service in 1886
 , an 
 , a Buque de Acción Marítima patrol vessel

Spanish Navy ship names